Kevin Wright (19 February 1933 – 3 October 2003) was an Australian rules footballer who played for Fitzroy in the Victorian Football League (VFL).

Wright was used initially in the midfield, either as a centre, rover or wingman. Towards the end of his career he played more as a forward after establishing himself with a six-goal haul in the opening round of the 1958 VFL season. He kicked 43 in 1959 to top Fitzroy's goal-kicking and was their most prolific forward again the following season with 36 goals.

Wright moved to the Dandenong Football Club in the Victorian Football Association in 1962, and served there as captain-coach until 1964; he led the club to a Division 2 premiership in 1962, and kicked six goals in the grand final. After leaving Dandenong, Wright returned to Fitzroy where he became a director. He also spent a season, in 1972, as non-playing coach of Preston.

References

Holmesby, Russell and Main, Jim (2007). The Encyclopedia of AFL Footballers. 7th ed. Melbourne: Bas Publishing.

External links

1933 births
2003 deaths
Fitzroy Football Club players
Dandenong Football Club players
Dandenong Football Club coaches
Preston Football Club (VFA) coaches
Australian rules footballers from Victoria (Australia)